Copper(II) thiocyanate (or cupric thiocyanate) is a coordination polymer with formula Cu(SCN)2. It is a black solid which slowly decomposes in moist air. It was first reported in 1838 by Carl Ernst Claus and its structure was determined first in 2018.

Structure 
The structure of Cu(SCN)2 was determined via powder X-ray diffraction and consists of chains of Cu(NCS)2 linked together by weak Cu-S-Cu bonds into two-dimensional layers. It can be considered a Jahn-Teller distorted analogue of the mercury thiocyanate structure-type. Each copper is octahedrally coordinated by four sulfurs and two nitrogens. The sulfur end of the SCN- ligand is doubly bridging.

Synthesis 
Copper(II) thiocyanate can be prepared from the reaction of concentrated solutions of copper(II) and a soluble thiocyanate salt in water, precipitating as a black powder. With rapid drying, pure Cu(SCN)2 can be isolated. Reaction at lower concentrations and for longer periods of time generates instead copper(I) thiocyanate.

Magnetism 
Copper(II) thiocyanate, like copper(II) bromide and copper(II) chloride, is a quasi low-dimensional antiferromagnet and it orders at 12K into a conventional Néel ground state.

References 

Copper(II) compounds
Coordination polymers
Thiocyanates